Kilynn King (born May 4, 1991) is an American professional wrestler, currently signed with Impact Wrestling, where she is the current Impact Knockouts World Tag Team Champion in her first reign.

Prior to Impact, she wrestled for All Elite Wrestling (AEW), National Wrestling Alliance (NWA). and various independent promotions.

Professional wrestling career

All Elite Wrestling (2020–2022) 
King made her All Elite Wrestling (AEW) debut on May 20, 2020, losing to Penelope Ford on AEW Dark. She made her AEW television debut on July 2, 2020, teaming with Kenzie Paige in a loss to Nyla Rose on Dynamite. On September 5, 2021, King participated in the Casino Battle Royale at All Out. King made her return to AEW on the August 17, 2022, episode of Dynamite, where she lost Toni Storm.

National Wrestling Alliance (2021–present) 
On August 28, 2021, King made her debut at National Wrestling Alliance (NWA), when she wrestled at the NWA EmPowerrr pay-per-view, teaming with Red Velvet in the NWA World Women's Tag Team Championship tournament, they defeated The Freebabes (Jazzy Yang and Miranda Gordy) in the first round before losing to The Hex (Allysin Kay and Marti Belle) in the finals.

King made her return to NWA on the April 12, 2022, episode of Powerrr, where she defeated Natalia Markova. On the May 10, 2022, episode of Powerrr, King defeated Chelsea Green and Jennacide to become the number one contender for the NWA World Women's Championship. On June 11, at Alwayz Ready, King challenged the champion Kamille, but was unsuccessful. On November 12, at Hard Times 3, King alongside Green challenged Kamille for the title in a Three-Way match. During the match, King managed to tap out Kamille, but Green distracted the referee, preventing from King to win. At the end of the match, Kamille retained the title.

New Japan Pro Wrestling (2022)
On October 28, 2022, she made her New Japan Pro-Wrestling (NJPW) debut, where she challenged Mayu Iwatani at Rumble on 44th Street for the SWA World Championship, but was unsuccessful.

Impact Wrestling (2022, 2023–present)
King made her Impact Wrestling debut on the December 22 2022, episode of Before the Impact (BTI), where she unsuccessfully challenged Taylor Wilde.

In March 2023, she returned to Impact Wrestling, aligning herself with Taylor Wilde, forming a team called The Coven.   On the March 16, 2023 episode of Impact!, Wilde and King defeated the Death Dollz to win the Impact Knockouts World Tag Team Championship.

Championships and accomplishments 
 Capital Championship Wrestling
 CCW Championship (1 time, current)
 CCW Network Champion (1 time, current)
 CCW Championship Tournament (2021)
 Coastal Championship Wrestling
 CCW Women's Championship (1 time)
 Gangrel's Wrestling Asylum
 GWA Women's Championship (1 time, current)
 Impact Wrestling
Impact Knockouts World Tag Team Championship  (1 time, current) – with Taylor Wilde
 Pro Wrestling 2.0 
 PW2.0 Women's Championship (1 time)
 Pro Wrestling Illustrated
 Ranked No. 80 of the top 150 female wrestlers in the PWI Women's 150 in 2022

References

External links 
 
 
 

1991 births
21st-century professional wrestlers
American female professional wrestlers
Living people
Professional wrestlers from Florida